Greece participated at both editions of the European Games.

Medal Tables

Medals by Games

Medals by sports

List of medallists

See also
 Greece at the Olympics

References